Palmetto High School, a high school located in Palmetto, Florida was originally opened in 1957 and rebuilt in 1999. The school's athletic teams are known as the Tigers, and the school colors are red, white, and black. The school currently serves students in grades 9 through 12.

Campus layout
The campus is made up of about 70 buildings. The cafeteria, office, library, old auditorium are located in the near the front of the school and the art room, gym, new auditorium, and JROTC building are in the back of the school.

Notable alumni 

Damian Copeland, NFL wide receiver for the Jacksonville Jaguars.
Ralph Haben, former Speaker of the Florida House of Representatives.
Joe Hills, AFL wide receiver for the Tampa Bay Storm.
Mistral Raymond, former NFL defensive back for the Minnesota Vikings and former captain at the University of South Florida.
Chris Smith, NFL, AFL and CFL player.

References

External links 
 Palmetto High School
 School profile

High schools in Manatee County, Florida
Public high schools in Florida
1930 establishments in Florida